Garitano is a Basque surname. It may refer to:

Ander Garitano (born 1969), Spanish football player and coach
Asier Garitano (born 1969), Spanish football player and coach
Gaizka Garitano (born 1975), Spanish football player and coach

See also
Garicano

Basque-language surnames